Dog Islands are a small group of islets among the British Virgin Islands in the Caribbean.

The islands originally received their names from sailors who heard barking when they moored there, and assumed that they must be dogs.  However, the barking noises were made by Caribbean monk seals.  The sailors also regarded the Caribbean monk seal as a good source of fresh seal meat, and as a result, they are now extinct.

Geography
The coordinates of the main islet are 18°28′96″N and 64°27′70″W.

The uninhabited islets are of volcanic origin and have a total area of about 

The group consist of 5 islets:

 Great Dog Island, main islet, about 
 George Dog Island, about 
 West Dog Island, about 

 Little Seal Dog Island (mostly called West Seal Dog), about 

Situated west off George Dog and within the same sub-group lies the small islet Cockroach Island.

History
The first European sighting of the Virgin Islands was by Christopher Columbus in 1493 on his second voyage to the New World.

Today the waters around the islets are a popular site for scuba diving (3).

West Seal Dog nowadays is a BVI National Park.

See also
 Dog Island and Isle of Dogs, for similarly-named places

References

External links
about "The Dogs"
map of "The Dogs"
about Seal Dogs
about West Dog
about dive sites at "The Dogs"